Kennett School District #39 is a school district headquartered in Kennett, Missouri.

Schools
 Kennett High School
 Kennett Middle School
 Masterson Elementary School
 South Elementary School
 Early Childhood Center
 Kennett Career & Technology Center

References

External links
 

School districts in Missouri
Education in Dunklin County, Missouri